Francesco Miano-Petta (born April 12, 1979, in Naples) is a retired amateur Italian freestyle wrestler, who competed in the men's super heavyweight category. He won two bronze medals in the 120-kg division at the Mediterranean Games (2005 and 2009), and finished tenth at the 2004 Summer Olympics, representing his nation Italy. Having worked as a police officer for Polizia di Stato, Miano-Petta trained full-time for the wrestling squad at VVF Padula in Naples, under head coach Luigi Marigliano.

Miano-Petta qualified for the Italian squad in the men's 120 kg class at the 2004 Summer Olympics in Athens. Earlier in the process, Miano-Petta finished third from the Olympic Qualification Tournament in Sofia, Bulgaria to guarantee his spot on the Italian wrestling team. He lost two opening matches each to U.S. wrestler Kerry McCoy (0–7) and Kazakhstan's Marid Mutalimov (0–3) by an identical margin, but sailed smoothly with an easy victory over Kyrgyzstan's Yury Mildzihov, who forfeited to appear in their match due to injury. Finishing third in the prelim pool and tenth overall, Miano-Petta's performance was not enough to advance him to the quarterfinals.

Miano-Petta also sought his bid for the 2008 Summer Olympics in Beijing, but failed to earn a spot on a miniature Italian wrestling team from the Olympic Qualification Tournament. In 2009, he capped off his sporting career with a second career bronze medal in the 120-kg class at the Mediterranean Games in Pescara.

References

External links
Profile – International Wrestling Database

1979 births
Living people
Olympic wrestlers of Italy
Wrestlers at the 2004 Summer Olympics
Sportspeople from Naples
Italian male sport wrestlers
Mediterranean Games bronze medalists for Italy
Competitors at the 2005 Mediterranean Games
Competitors at the 2009 Mediterranean Games
Mediterranean Games medalists in wrestling